Nughab Rural District is in the Central District of Darmian County, South Khorasan province, Iran. Its constituent parts were in Miyandasht Rural District prior to its formation after the National Census of 2016. The capital of the rural district is the village of Nughab, whose population at the census was 3,520 people in 927 households.

References 

Darmian County

Rural Districts of South Khorasan Province

Populated places in South Khorasan Province

Populated places in Darmian County

fa:دهستان نوغاب